Leo Harrison (8 June 1922 – 12 October 2016) was an English first-class cricketer who played for Hampshire from 1939 to 1966. Harrison played in 396 first-class matches, 387 of which were for Hampshire. During his career Harrison made 8,854 runs at an average of 17.49 and took 578 catches and 103 stumpings.

Early career
Harrison joined the Hampshire ground staff in 1937 straight from school. A right-handed batsman, Harrison's primary role was as a wicketkeeper, but in his two pre-war matches and through several seasons after the Second World War he played mainly as a batsman while Neil McCorkell remained as first choice wicket keeper. He made his first-class debut as a 17-year-old in August 1939 at Bournemouth and played in Hampshire's last two county games before the outbreak of the second world war. Batting at number 7, he scored 9 and 12 respectively in his first match against Worcestershire which Hampshire lost by 32 runs and then 0 and 16 in the following match where Hampshire lost to Yorkshire by an innings and 11 runs. He then joined the RAF for the duration of the war.

County Championship
In the first championship season after the war in 1946 he remained on the fringe of the first eleven playing in just 7 championship matches and scoring only 100 runs at an average of 10.00. In 1947 he finally established himself in the side and played 18 championship matches, plus 4 other first-class games, scoring 567 runs and doubling his batting average to 20.25. Fittingly, he made his maiden century for Hampshire against Worcestershire at Southampton in 1951, which was instrumental helping Hampshire to a 5 wicket victory. That proved to be his best season with the bat, scoring 1189 runs at an average of 30.48.

After McCorkell retired in 1951 Ralph Prouton took over as first choice wicket keeper for the 1952 season. After alternating with Prouton in 1953, he duly became first choice keeper from 1954 until 1962 when Brian Timms succeeded him. He continued to be available as reserve wicketkeeper but only played in one further championship match for Hampshire (aged 43) in the drawn match against Surrey in May 1966, where his last victim was skipper Mickey Stewart, who he caught for 13 off the bowling of Butch White. That appearance made him the last player to have appeared in a County Championship match who had previously played in a pre-war championship game.

Other matches
Harrison also represented the Combined Services in three first-class matches as well as one for the Royal Air Force against Worcestershire in 1946. He also appeared in the annual Gentlemen v Players match at Lord's in 1955 (for the Players) and the MCC v Australians at Lord's in the following year. He continued to play regularly for the Hampshire 2nd XI up until 1969 before making a final appearance for them against Gloucestershire 2nd XI in June 1970 (aged 48).

Addendum
Harrison was a regular spectator at Hampshire matches at the Rose Bowl until the end of his life. He was a long-time friend of the cricket commentator John Arlott. He was the guest of honour at the unveiling of The Cricket Society plaque commemorating Arlott's residency at the Old Sun in New Alresford in 2009.

By August 2015, he was one of only two surviving county cricketers who played before World War II, along with John Manners (also of Hampshire, born 1914).

He died on 12 October 2016.

References

External links
Leo Harrison on Cricinfo
Leo Harrison on CricketArchive

1922 births
2016 deaths
English cricketers
Hampshire cricketers
People from Christchurch, Dorset
Cricketers from Dorset
Marylebone Cricket Club cricketers
Royal Air Force cricketers
Combined Services cricketers
Players cricketers
Royal Air Force personnel of World War II
Wicket-keepers